Laukaha Assembly constituency is an assembly constituency in Madhubani district in the Indian state of Bihar.

Overview
As per Delimitation of Parliamentary and Assembly constituencies Order, 2008, No. 40  Laukaha Assembly constituency is composed of the following: Laukaha and Laukahi community development blocks; Ekhatha, Bathnaha, Gohumabairia, Saini, Dhanouja, Sugapatti, Kalapatti, Siswar gram panchayats of Phulparas CD Block.

Laukaha Assembly constituency is part of No. 7 Jhanjharpur (Lok Sabha constituency).

Members of Legislative Assembly

Election results

2020

References

External links
 

Assembly constituencies of Bihar
Politics of Madhubani district